Conor Mark Chaplin (born 16 February 1997) is an English professional footballer who plays as a forward for League One club Ipswich Town and is known for his versatility in attack, goal-scoring and playmaking. 

Chaplin joined the youth set up at Portsmouth in 2003, progressing through the club's academy to make his senior debut in December 2014. He won the 2015 League Two Apprentice Award during his first season as a senior professional. He helped Portsmouth win the EFL League Two title in 2016–17, going on to make 122 appearances and score 25 goals during his time at the club. He joined Coventry City on loan in 2018, before signing permanently for the club in January 2019. After one season at Coventry, he signed for Barnsley in 2019. Chaplin spent two seasons at Barnsley, helping the club to Championship survival during his first season at the club, and then go on to reach the EFL Championship play-offs in the 2020–21 season. In July 2021, Chaplin signed for Ipswich Town.

Club career

Portsmouth
Born in Worthing, Chaplin progressed through Portsmouth's youth categories after joining the club at the age of six. He was offered a two-year scholarship contract on 3 July 2013.

2014–15 season & senior breakthrough
Chaplin signed a two-year professional deal with Pompey on 20 October 2014, after scoring 11 goals in 11 appearances for the under-18's. He made his League Two debut on 13 December, from the bench in a 2–3 home defeat against Accrington Stanley. Chaplin scored his first professional goal on 11 April 2015, netting his team's only goal in a 1–3 away defeat against Morecambe. He made his first start for Pompey in their final game of the season, a 1–1 home draw against York City. At the end of the season he was named the League Two Apprentice of the Year.

2015–16 season
Chaplin started the 2015–16 season on the bench, playing second fiddle to first-choice striker Matt Tubbs, but showcased his talents with goals against Championship clubs Derby and Reading in the first and second rounds of the Football League Cup, also scoring in the 3rd round of the FA Cup in a 2–2 draw with Ipswich Town. He scored his first two league goals of the season in a 3–1 win over Barnet on 12 September. Although Chaplin struggled to maintain a first-team place in the league, he would still manage to score 11 goals in 38 appearances in all competitions over the course of the season.

2016–17 season
Competition for the sole striking berth in manager Paul Cook's preferred 4–2–3–1 formation was made all the more intense at the start of the 2016–17 season, following the signings of Michael Smith, who made his loan move permanent, as well as Curtis Main from Doncaster Rovers and experienced forward Noel Hunt.

Chaplin subsequently found himself on the bench in the early weeks of the season, before the inconsistent form of Smith and Main, coupled with Hunt's injury problems, saw Chaplin promoted to the starting lineup. He grasped the opportunity, scoring league goals against Wycombe Wanderers, Barnet, Blackpool, Notts County and Cambridge United before the end of October – a run of form which would see him established as Portsmouth's first-choice striker.

As the season continued, Cook would rotate his centre-forwards, and Chaplin lost his place to the more physically-imposing Smith. Though Smith would ultimately fall out of favour and move to Northampton Town in the January transfer window, the signing of Eoin Doyle – who had previously played under Cook at Chesterfield – ensured that Chaplin would remain on the bench. Chaplin continued to make cameo appearances as a substitute, however, and took his tally to eight for the season with a last-gasp, 25 yard strike against Barnet to snatch a point in a 1–1 draw on 18 February. Chaplin finished the season with 8 goals in 42 appearances, helping Portsmouth to lift the EFL League Two title.

2017–18 season
Following Portsmouth's promotion to EFL League One, Chaplin continued to feature regularly. He scored his first goal of the season on 26 August, netting an equalizer in a 1–1 draw with Wigan Athletic. On 10 February, he scored a late winner in a 2–1 away win against Milton Keynes Dons. Chaplin helped Portsmouth establish themselves in League One after an 8th placed finish, making 32 appearances in all competitions, scoring 5 goals.

Coventry City
At the end of August 2018, Chaplin joined Coventry City on loan with an agreement in place to sign permanently in the following January. He made his debut in a 0–1 defeat against Rochdale on 1 September. Chaplin scored his first goal for the club from the penalty spot in a 2–1 away victory against Oxford United on 9 September.

Chaplin completed his permanent move to Coventry on 4 January. On 19 January Chaplin scored the opener in a 2–1 away defeat to Plymouth Argyle. On 13 April, Chaplin scored the winning goal in a 5–4 away win against Sunderland. He scored 8 goals in 32 appearances for Coventry during the 2018–19 season.

Barnsley
On 19 July 2019 Chaplin joined Barnsley for an undisclosed fee on a four-year deal. He made his debut for the club as a second-half substitute on the opening day of the 2019–20 season, against Fulham. Two weeks later, he scored his first goal for Barnsley, scoring in a 2–2 draw with Charlton Athletic. He did not score again until 23 November, when he scored in a 2–3 loss against Blackburn Rovers. His goal scoring form improved from that point, going on to score 7 goals in his next 7 games, including scoring his first career hat-trick in a 5–3 Barnsley victory over QPR at Oakwell on 14 December. His form earned him the EFL Championship Player of the Month award for December. He became a key player during his first season at Barnsley, scoring 13 goals in 47 appearances, with 11 goals coming in the Championship. He helped Barnsley to survival on the final day of the season.

He continued to feature as a key part of Barnsley's first-team during the 2020–21 season. He scored his first goal of the season in a 3–0 win against Queens Park Rangers on 27 October. Chaplin made 39 appearances in all competitions over the course of the season, including 30 league starts, scoring 4 goals. He helped Barnsley turn their fortunes around from the previous season by helping the club qualify for the EFL Championship play-offs following a 5th placed league finish.

Ipswich Town
On 27 July 2021, Chaplin joined Ipswich Town, on a three-year deal for an officially undisclosed fee, understood to be in the region of £750,000. He made his debut for Ipswich on the opening day of the 2021–22 season in a 2–2 home draw with Morecambe at Portman Road. He scored his first goal for the club on 25 September, netting a 90th minute equalizer in a 1–1 home draw with Sheffield Wednesday.

Career statistics

Honours
Portsmouth
EFL League Two: 2016–17

Individual
League Two Apprentice Award: 2014–15
EFL Championship Player of the Month: December 2019
PFA Fans' League One Player of the Month: August 2022, September 2022
EFL League One Player of the Month: December 2022

References

External links
Conor Chaplin profile at the Ipswich Town F.C. website

1997 births
Living people
Sportspeople from Worthing
English footballers
Association football forwards
English Football League players
Portsmouth F.C. players
Coventry City F.C. players
Barnsley F.C. players
Ipswich Town F.C. players